Gerhart Adolf Husserl (December 22, 1893 – September 9, 1973) was a German legal scholar and philosopher. He was the son of philosopher Edmund Husserl (1859–1938).

Born in Halle, Saxony, in 1893, Husserl became a Professor of Law at the University of Kiel in 1926. He was dismissed due to the Law for the Restoration of the Professional Civil Service in 1933, and eventually emigrated to the United States. He taught at the University of Washington from 1940 to 1948.

References 

1893 births
1973 deaths
German legal scholars
Academic staff of the University of Kiel
University of Washington faculty
Jewish philosophers
Jewish emigrants from Nazi Germany to the United States